Paracynarctus is an extinct genus of  the Borophaginae subfamily of canids native to North America. It was likely an omnivore, and lacked the bone-cracking adaptations found in some later borophagines.

P. kelloggi was originally found Virgin Valley, Nevada in a Barstovian terrestrial horizon.

References

 
Miocene carnivorans
Serravallian extinctions
Miocene mammals of North America
Prehistoric carnivoran genera
Aquitanian first appearances